Salina, also known as Salina Springs, Salinas Springs, and Tselani, is a populated place situated in Apache County, Arizona, United States. The name of Salina became official as a result of decision by the Board on Geographic Names in 1960.

References

External links
 Salina – ghosttowns.com

Ghost towns in Arizona
Populated places in Apache County, Arizona